José Ruperto Monagas (1831 – 12 June 1880) was a Venezuelan Militant and Politician, son of José Tadeo Monagas and Luisa Oriach. He was the president of Venezuela between 1869–1870 because he won the presidential elections in the period of 1868-1870 In 1857.

As a representative of the city of Maturín, he made the Constitution of April of that year. In March of the following year, he was appointed commander of Barcelona, a position from which he was a supporter of President Julián Castro, despite which General Justo Briceño, a representative of the Government, imprisoned him in the castle of Puerto Cabello distrusting his loyalty. towards the regime.

Biography 
Born in Aragua de Barcelona in 1831 and died in the same town on June 12, 1880.

Personal life
José Ruperto Monagas was married to Esperanza Hernández, who served as First Lady of Venezuela from 1869–1870.

See also 
Presidents of Venezuela

References

External links
   José Ruperto Monagas

1831 births
1880 deaths
Presidents of Venezuela
Venezuelan soldiers
People from Barcelona, Venezuela
Venezuelan people of Spanish descent
Great Liberal Party of Venezuela politicians
Monagas family